Cranium, Inc. was a toy and board game developer. The company was founded in 1998 by two former Microsoft executives, Richard Tait and Whit Alexander. They co-developed the Cranium board game.

History
After realizing that he always won at the game Pictionary, but lost more than frequently at the game Scrabble, Tait decided to make a game where everyone could win at something. Drawing inspiration from the HBDI thinking styles assessment they completed at Microsoft, Tait and Alexander aimed to create a "Whole Brain" game. Taking certain aspects of other favorite games, Cranium requires players to spell, draw, mold clay, and answer trivia questions. Tait and Alexander created "a board-game where everyone has heroic moments". Cranium, Inc. tested and modified their new game over and over. They knew they had a hit game on their hands when one day the game testers tried to steal the game. Without having a retail outlet to sell their game, Cranium, Inc. ordered 20,000 units to be manufactured in China. Cranium, Inc. did have big name investors, such as Starbucks, where they were able to raise US$35 million. Cranium, Inc. went on to win over 130 awards and sell over 22 million games and toys. The company was bought out by Hasbro on January 4, 2008 for $77.5 million.

Marketing and advertising
Cranium, Inc. marketing strategies were considered unorthodox by traditional game marketing standards. Because Cranium came out after Christmas, and Cranium, Inc. did not want to compete in the traditional game buying market of toy stores, they decided to sell their game where their target audience would be. The target audience for Cranium  was "25-35 year old, dating yuppies who wanted to connect to each other." Cranium, Inc. partnered with its investor, Starbucks, and sold the game at over 1500 Starbucks locations. Cranium, Inc. then partnered with Barnes & Noble to have their games sold at their locations. Cranium became the first game sold at the bookstore chain. Cranium, Inc. also created a membership called "Club Cranium" that one could sign up for using codes included in marketing brochures included in their games; the club was later discontinued after the acquisition by Hasbro.

In 1998, Cranium, Inc. had only spent $15,000, a relatively low figure, on marketing and advertising. While most other games advertised on TV, Cranium, Inc. advertised Cranium on the radio. Radio jocks would ask its listeners Craniums trivia questions and winners got the game for free. Also, Cranium, Inc. made partnerships where Cranium questions were featured on Delta Song Airlines napkins, Dr. Pepper bottles at KFC, and on packages of Land O' Lakes butter. Bill Furlong, Cranium, Inc.'s Director of Marketing had said that the game company "was giving people a chance to try their game everywhere from the grocery store, to 30,000 feet in the air on Delta Song Airplane". Cranium, Inc. also found advertisement in celebrity endorsements. On The Oprah Winfrey Show, Julia Roberts stated that Cranium "was the most fun game ever" and that she and boyfriend Benjamin Bratt "could not stop playing it.  Al Gore and Bill Gates, Tait and Alexander's former boss, even endorsed the game.

Cranium

Cranium is a party board game based on Ludo. It is billed as "The Game for Your Whole Brain." Unlike many other party games, Cranium includes a wide variety of activities.

Giorgio Davanzo created the packaging and brand identity for the game, and Gary Baseman, creator of the animated series Teacher's Pet, did the art.

Spin-offs
Cranium Cadoo, a version for kids (7 and up), won the "Game of the Year" award for 2002 from the Toy Industry Association.

Cranium Hullabaloo, a version of the game aimed at young kids (4 and up), won the "Game of the Year" award for 2003 from the Toy Industry Association.

Toys and games
Whoonu
Balloon Lagoon
Ballpark Blast
Cadoo
Bumparena
Cariboo
Connect-O-Round
Cranium Wonder Works Talking Picture Book
Doodle Tales
Family Fun
Giggle Gear Mega Mask
Hoopla
Hullabaloo DVD Game
Let's Play Neighborhood Family Fun Game
Megafort
Pop 5
Super Fort Carnival Clubhouse
Zigity
Zooreka

Awards
Cranium was named "Game of the Year" for 2001 by the Toy Industry Association.

References

External links

Board game publishing companies
Companies based in Seattle
1998 establishments in Washington (state)
2008 disestablishments in Washington (state)
Manufacturing companies established in 1998
Manufacturing companies disestablished in 2008
Hasbro games
Party board games
2008 mergers and acquisitions